Year 129 (CXXIX) was a common year starting on Friday (link will display the full calendar) of the Julian calendar. At the time, it was known as the Year of the Consulship of Celsus and Marcellus (or, less frequently, year 882 Ab urbe condita). The denomination 129 for this year has been used since the early medieval period, when the Anno Domini calendar era became the prevalent method in Europe for naming years.

Events 
 By place 
 Roman Empire 
 A defense for Numidia is constructed at Lambaesis by Legio III Augusta. 
 Emperor Hadrian continues his voyages, now inspecting Caria, Cappadocia and Syria.

 By topic 
Songs
 The song "Angel's Hymn" is made.

 Religion 
 Change of Patriarch of Constantinople, from Patriarch Diogenes to Eleutherius.

Births 
 Chen Ji, Chinese official, chancellor (d. 199)
 Galen, Greek physician, anatomist (d. c. 200/216)
 Liu Hong, Chinese official, astronomer  (d. 210)

Deaths 
 June 19 – Justus of Alexandria, Egyptian patriarch
 King Osroes I of the Parthian Empire

References